Hariata Ropata-Tangahoe (born 1952) is a New Zealand artist, painter and author. She is of Ngati Toa, Ngati Raukawa and Te Atiawa descent. Her works are held in the permanent collections of the Museum of New Zealand Te Papa Tongarewa, the BNZ Art Collection, the Dowse Art Gallery and the University of Auckland Art Collection.

References

1952 births
Living people
New Zealand women artists
New Zealand contemporary artists
Elam Art School alumni
People from Ōtaki, New Zealand